was a town located in Yatsuka District, Shimane Prefecture, Japan.

As of 2003, the town had an estimated population of 13,817 and a density of 324.04 per km². The total area was 42.64 km².

On August 1, 2011, Higashiizumo was merged into the expanded city of Matsue and no longer exists as an independent municipality. Yatsuka District was dissolved as a result of this merger.

References

External links
 Matsue official website 

Dissolved municipalities of Shimane Prefecture